Sobral de Monte Agraço is a municipality in the District of Lisbon in Portugal. The population in 2011 was 10,156, in an area of 52.10 km².

The present Mayor is António Lopes Bogalho, elected by the Unitary Democratic Coalition.

History
During the Peninsular War, Sobral was on the Lines of Torres Vedras, a line of forts planned by the Duke of Wellington to protect Lisbon. In October 1810, a French army led by André Masséna approached the Lines, finding that the Portuguese had subjected the area in front of them to a scorched earth policy. After the minor Battle of Sobral on 14 October, the French found they could go no further. Charles Oman writes "On that misty October 14th morning, at Sobral, the Napoleonic tide attained its highest watermark."

Monuments
 St. Salvador Chapel - 13th century Romanesque style
 Sobral Main Church - 16th century Renaissance style
 São Quintino Church - 16th-17th century Manueline and Renaissance styles
 Our Lady of Purification Church - 16th century Renaissance style
 Town Hall and ancient jail - 18th century
 Fort of Alqueidão - 19th century
 Cine-Theater - 20th century Art Deco style

Parishes

Administratively, the municipality is divided into 3 civil parishes (freguesias):
 São Quintino
 Sapataria
 Sobral de Monte Agraço

Notable people 
 José António Freire Sobral (1840 in São Quintino – 1905), a rich farmer and a large exporter of coffee, cocoa and woods who made his fortune in São Tomé Island in Portuguese São Tomé and Príncipe.
 Fábio Silvestre (born 1990 in Sobral de Monte Agraço) a Portuguese former cyclist

References

External links

 Town Council official website
 Photos from Sobral de Monte Agraço

Towns in Portugal
Municipalities of Lisbon District
Lines of Torres Vedras